Cemil is a Turkish given name and is derived from Arabic Jamil with other Arabic variants Gamil (mainly in Egypt), Djemil (mainly in North African countries) and Djamil.

The feminine equivalent is Cemile (derived from Arabic Jamila and its Arabic variants Gamila and Djemila).

People with the name
Mesut Cemil (1902–1963), Turkish composer, and tanbur and cello player
Cemil Bayik, founding member and a leader of the Kurdish separatist organization PKK
Cemil Cahit Toydemir (1883-1956), officer of the Ottoman Army and the general of the Turkish Army
Cemil Çiçek, Turkish politician and Deputy Prime Minister of Turkey
Cemil Conk (1873-1963), officer of the Ottoman Army and the general of the Turkish Army
Cemil Mengi, Turkish-German soccer player
Cemil Ozyurt (born 1976), Turkish journalist
Cemil Şeboy, Turkish politician and former mayor of Buca district in Izmir Province
Cemil Topuzlu, a famous Turkish surgeon, also known as Cemil Pasha
Cemil Tosun, Turkish-Austrian soccer player
Cemil Turan, Turkish soccer player 
Tamburi Cemil Bey, Turkish musician

See also
Cemil Topuzlu Open-Air Theatre (Turkish: Cemil Topuzlu Harbiye Açık Hava Tiyatrosu), a contemporary amphitheatre located in the Harbiye neighborhood of İstanbul, Turkey
Cemal
Gamil (disambiguation)
Jamil

Turkish masculine given names